"Hurry Up England – The People's Anthem" is a charity single by English punk rock band Sham 69, featuring Graham Coxon on guitar. The single – a somewhat opportunistic re-working of Sham 69's earlier hit "Hurry Up Harry", was recorded as an alternative football anthem for England's entry in the 2006 FIFA World Cup. It was released 12 June 2006 as "The People's Anthem," after being voted on by fans of Virgin Radio DJ Christian O'Connell's morning show (see 2006 in British music). On 18 June, the single debuted at #10 in the UK Singles Chart, two places below the official song of the England squad, "World at Your Feet" by Embrace. The single fell to #31 during its second week in the chart, and then to #50 in its third week.

Track listings
7" R6704, CD CDR6704
"Hurry Up England – The People's Anthem" (Sham 69 and The Special Assembly)
"All Go Mad" (Howling at the Moon + The Dorchester Raiders Under 8's Football Team)

Chart performance

Trivia
Football players Rio Ferdinand, John Terry, Steven Gerrard, Frank Lampard, Joe Cole, Sol Campbell and Wayne Rooney are mentioned in the song.

External links
Official artist website
The People's Anthem webpage
Virgin.net Music News
Video at Virgin Radio

2006 singles
Parlophone singles
England national football team songs
Sham 69 songs
2006 songs
Song recordings produced by Stephen Street
Football songs and chants